IPSC Kuwait is the Kuwaiti association for practical shooting under the International Practical Shooting Confederation.

References 

the ipsc kuwait start on 2016 under regnal director Mr Khaled aljerayed and his crow :
Vic P: abdulla alhamar
instructor : ali abdullah alkandari
instructor : ali abdalaziz hussain 
secretary fahad alsaeed
secretary ali abdulazez mataki

Regions of the International Practical Shooting Confederation
Sports organizations of Kuwait